The Stoughton High School building is located in Stoughton, Wisconsin.

History
The building was constructed to take the place of the previous high school that had been built roughly thirty years before. Also known as the Central Public School, it was later used as a junior high school before being utilized as an office building for the local school board beginning in the 1980s. It was added to the State Register of Historic Places in 2001 and to the National Register of Historic Places the following year.

References

School buildings on the National Register of Historic Places in Wisconsin
Office buildings on the National Register of Historic Places in Wisconsin
National Register of Historic Places in Dane County, Wisconsin
Public high schools in Wisconsin
Public middle schools in Wisconsin
Schools in Dane County, Wisconsin
Defunct schools in Wisconsin
Romanesque Revival architecture in Wisconsin
Brick buildings and structures
School buildings completed in 1893
1893 establishments in Wisconsin